The Winston-Salem Fairgrounds Annex (formerly named the LJVM Coliseum Annex) is a 4,000-seat multi-purpose arena in Winston-Salem, North Carolina. It was built in 1989.  It was formerly home to the Winston-Salem Thunderbirds, Winston-Salem Mammoths, Winston-Salem IceHawks, Winston-Salem T-Birds, Winston-Salem Polar Twins, and Twin City Cyclones ice hockey teams. It also serves as an occasional concert venue, hosting Bob Dylan on two occasions, in 1991 and 2002.

It was originally part of the Lawrence Joel Veterans Memorial Coliseum, which used to be part of the larger Winston-Salem Sports and Entertainment Complex, and was named the LJVM Coliseum Annex. In 2013, the city sold the Coliseum to Wake Forest University and renamed the complex and smaller arena to Winston-Salem Fairgrounds in 2014. It is located adjacent to the Winston-Salem Fairgrounds.

The Winston-Salem Fairgrounds Annex was home to the Winston Wildcats, an indoor football team that was part of American Indoor Football and later an independent.

Since 2017, it has been home to the Carolina Thunderbirds, a minor league hockey team in the Federal Prospects Hockey League.

References

External links
Winston-Salem Fairgrounds homepage

Indoor arenas in North Carolina
Indoor ice hockey venues in the United States
Winston-Salem State Rams men's basketball
Sports venues in Winston-Salem, North Carolina
1989 establishments in North Carolina
Sports venues completed in 1989
College basketball venues in the United States
Basketball venues in North Carolina